Norman "Nobby" Oliver is a former professional rugby league footballer who played in the 1960s and 1970s. He played at club level for Hull F.C. (Heritage № 643)  and Featherstone Rovers (Heritage № 485).

Club career
Norman Oliver made his début for Hull F.C. on Saturday 11 September 1965 and for Featherstone Rovers on Saturday 26 October 1968.

References

External links
Search for "Oliver" at rugbyleagueproject.org

Featherstone Rovers players
Hull F.C. players
Place of birth missing
English rugby league players
Year of birth missing